Chelsey Matson (née Bell) (born September 1, 1982) is a Canadian curler.

Career
Matson was the long-time lead for Stefanie Lawton. She played for her at the 2001 Canadian Junior Curling Championships and at the 2005 Scott Tournament of Hearts. However, it was in 2003 when playing lead for Lawton's sister, Marliese Kasner that she won the Canadian and World Junior Curling Championships. She was named the all-star lead at the World Juniors that year.

Matson left the Lawton team in 2007 to play with Kleibrink. With Kleibrink, Bell has shared several successes, including winning the Casinos of Winnipeg Grand Slam in October 2007 and the 2008 Alberta Provincial Championship in January 2008.

Personal life
Matson was born in Regina, Saskatchewan. Matson married in the summer of 2011.

References

External links
 

1982 births
Living people
Canada Cup (curling) participants
Canadian women curlers
Curlers from Alberta
Curlers from Regina, Saskatchewan